Jeong Seon (1676 – 20 April 1759) was a Korean landscape painter, also known by the pen name Gyeomjae. His ja was Wonbaek and another ho was Nangok. His works include ink and oriental water paintings, such as Inwangjesaekdo (1751), Geumgang jeondo (1734), and Ingokjeongsa (1742), as well as numerous "true-view" landscape paintings on the subject of Korea and the history of its culture. He is counted among the most famous Korean painters. The landscape paintings that he produced reflect most of the geographical features of Korea. His style is realistic rather than abstract.

Biography 
Jeong was born on 16 February 1676, in the Jongno District of Seoul, in the Cheongun-dong neighborhood. He was the eldest son of Jeong Si-ik (1638–1689), the descendant of an illustrious and gentry family that originally came from Gwangju. Soon in infancy, he was noted for his artistic talents and is said to have painted daily, with a prolific output until old age. But his family was so poor that he couldn't become a scholar-painter (a yangban painting for leisure). Nevertheless, he was introduced in a circle of powerful neighbors and was, on their recommendation, allowed to work for the Dohwaseo (Joseon Bureau of Paintings) and also created landscapes for patrons and clients.

In 1711, when he was 36 years old, he toured Mt. Geumgang with Pak Tae-yu (1648–1746), the local governor, and produced the 13-paintings Album Pungak Mountain, Sin-myo Year. The next year, another trip to Mt. Geumgang produced the 30 paintings Album Realistic Representations of Sea and Mountains. Both albums were augmented by various poems written by Jeong Seon's protectors. His self-chosen pen name Gyeomjae (i.e. "humble study") was reflecting this asymmetrical relationship.

In 1716, when he was 41 years old, he was granted a tenure of Geomgyosu (兼敎授; professor extraordinary) at Gwansanggam (觀象監; the Office for Observance of Natural Phenomena). This was taking into account the fact that Jeong Seon was from beginning proficient at Book of Changes(周易) and Astronomy. But this gave him further impetus... and an official position. He served as district magistrate of Hayang (1721–1726), of Cheongha (c. 1733), and of Yangcheon (1740–1745). Later in life, he was honored by King Yeongjo, who bestowed on him the official title of the fourth rank in 1754 and the second rank in 1756.

Significance 

Jeong is one of the most famous Korean painters. He inspired other Korean artists to follow suit, leaving a lasting impact on Korean art. He was the most eminent painter in the late Joseon Dynasty. Jeong explored the scenic beauty of the capital city of Hanyang (Seoul), the Han River, the Sea of Japan, and the Diamond Mountain. He is the first painter of true-view Korean landscapes. Differing from earlier techniques and traditional Chinese styles, he created a new style of painting depicting the virtues of Korea.

By the end of the decade, Jeong had developed his own, more realistic style, likely under the influence of the Sirhak movement. This set him apart from the then-prevailing Chinese literati tradition of idealised and abstract landscape art. His grandson, Jeong Hwang (鄭榥, 1737–?), displayed the true-view landscape style in addition to genre painting.

Style 

Jeong was one of the few known Korean painters to depart from traditional Chinese styles. It is reported that he frequently left his studio and painted the world around him, as he could see it. His paintings are classified as part of the Southern School, but he developed his own style by realistically portraying natural scenes such as mountains and streams with bold strokes of his brush.

A major characteristic of his work is intermixed dark and light areas, created by layers of ink wash and lines. His mountains are punctuated by forests, which in turn are lightened by mists and waterfalls. Vegetation is made from dots, a technique that bears the influence of Chinese painter Mi Fei (1052–1107). Jeong's style would influence generations of Korean artists, and become one of the iconic images of Korean nationalism.

Gallery

See also 
Korean painting
List of Korean painters

References

Sources

English sources
 Museum 
the MET 
MET.  catalog of the June 5, 1998—Jan. 24, 1999 exhibition. (fully available online as PDF). 
KAA   original seems dead
 Original is largely quicker.

 Jstor subscription

linked to dbpia

  
linked at academic.naver
Xiaoxiangbajin i.e. Sosangpalgyeongdo is described at Canterbury Thesis
 
linked at academic.naver
 
linked at academic.naver
linked at KCI
 
linked at academic.naver

Further reading

External links 

 search Jeong Seon at MET
 Jeong Seon's Place in Korean Art History

1676 births
1759 deaths
Landscape artists
18th-century Korean painters
18th-century Korean astronomers